Sir Robert Hugh Hanley Baird  (1855–1934) was a newspaper proprietor from Northern Ireland. He was born in Belfast and educated at Model School and Royal Belfast Academical Institution. In 1869, he entered the firm of W. & G. Baird, Arthur Street, Belfast, and was present at the first publication of The Telegraph, on 1 September 1870.  Baird served as managing director of W & G Baird from 1886 until his death in 1934. He founded and owned a series of newspapers, including: the Belfast Weekly Telegraph (1873), Ballymena Weekly Telegraph (1887), Ireland's Saturday Night (1894), Belfast Telegraph (1904), Irish Daily Telegraph (1904) and The Larne Times (1891).

 
Baird was a lifelong member and supporter of St George's Church, Belfast. He died in 1934 and is buried in Belfast City Cemetery. After his death a stained glass window by Clokey & Co. in Belfast was erected in his memory by the parishioners of his church, depicting the Good Samaritan.

Offices Held

 President, Master Printers' Federation of Great Britain and Ireland, 1910
 President, Irish Newspaper Society, 1913–1925
 Chairman, Ulster District, Institute of Journalists, 1916 and Fellow of the Institute
 Chairman, Belfast District, Newspaper Press Fund, 1910–1934
 Irish Representative, Admiralty, War Office and Press Committee 1916-1934
 Member Advisory Trade Committee of Paper Commission
 Freeman, City of London and Member of Worshipful Company of Stationers (1921–1934)
 Member of Senate of Queen's University, Belfast (1929–1934).

Arms

References

Businesspeople from Belfast
19th-century British newspaper founders
Businesspeople awarded knighthoods
1934 deaths
1855 births
Knights Commander of the Order of the British Empire
Burials at Belfast City Cemetery